The Chinese Islamic Cultural and Educational Foundation (CICEF) is an organization of Chinese Muslims in Taiwan. It is the first cultural foundation for Islamic education in Taiwan.

History
The foundation was established in 1976 by brothers Chang Zixuan (常子萱) and Chang Zichun (常子春) with a donation of NT$3 million. With the foundation being registered in 1982.

Activities
The association is based at the Taipei Grand Mosque in Taipei. It has been doing several activities such as propagating and preaching Islamic culture and doctrine, providing scholarships for the needy students, sponsoring the translation of Islamic scriptures and promoting communication and cooperation among Muslims around the world.

They also present awards to people who contribute to Islamic affairs, whose written works promote Islamic scholarship, have made significant contribution in national, religious and social work or who serve as Islamic youth model.

Structures
Composition of the foundation is:
 Board of directors
 Board chairman
 Executive board
 Executive secretary
 Office for international culture and education
 Office of academic
 Office of youth activity
 Office for library
 Office of finance
 Consultant

See also
 Islam in Taiwan
 List of mosques in Taiwan
 Chinese Muslim Association
 Chinese Muslim Youth League
 Taiwan Halal Integrity Development Association

References

External links
  

1976 establishments in Taiwan
Islamic organizations based in Taiwan
Organizations based in Taipei
Islamic organizations established in 1976